Amadou Boubacar Cissé (born 1948) is a Nigerien politician. He served as the Prime Minister of Niger on two occasions, from 8 to 21 February 1995 and again from 21 December 1996 to 27 November 1997. He has led a political party, the Union for Democracy and the Republic (UDR-Tabbat), since 1999, and he was appointed as Minister of State for Planning in 2011.

Political career
Cissé, a member of the Fula ethnic group, was born in Niamey. He began working for the World Bank in 1982, initially in Niger, but beginning in 1983 he was based in Washington, D.C., in the United States. At the World Bank he was in charge of its central African operations, dealing with structural adjustment programs and assistance.

Following the January 1995 parliamentary election, which was won by an alliance of the National Movement for the Development of Society (MNSD) and the Nigerien Party for Democracy and Socialism (PNDS), the parliamentary majority was composed of opponents of President Mahamane Ousmane. Rather than submit three names to Ousmane, from which he would choose the Prime Minister, the majority put forward Hama Amadou as its only candidate. Rejecting this, Ousmane chose Cissé as Prime Minister. Like Amadou, Cissé was a member of the MNSD, but his appointment was completely rejected by the parliamentary majority, and the MNSD promptly expelled him from the party for taking the position. After two weeks, Ousmane appointed Hama Amadou as Prime Minister, replacing Cissé, who had lost a censure motion on February 20, with 43 deputies supporting the motion and 40 opposing it. Opponents of the motion said that it was unconstitutional because Cissé had not yet formed a government.

Following a coup against Ousmane in January 1996, led by Ibrahim Baré Maïnassara, Cissé was named Minister of State for the Economy, Finances and Planning in August 1996. On December 21, 1996, he was named Prime Minister again. He was named vice-chairman of the ruling party, the Rally for Democracy and Progress (RDP), on August 20, 1997, at the party's national congress. On November 24, 1997, his government was dismissed by Maïnassara, who appointed Ibrahim Hassane Mayaki to replace Cissé as Prime Minister.

Following Maïnassara's assassination in April 1999, Cissé announced his intention to run in the October 1999 presidential election, and for this he was expelled from the RDP under party president Hamid Algabid on July 18, 1999. Physical fighting broke out at the RDP headquarters between supporters and opponents of Cissé, leading to intervention by the police. His faction of the RDP nominated him as its presidential candidate on August 1, and he was the first announced candidacy in the election, but the other faction of the party backed the candidacy of Algabid, and it was left to the Court of State to judge which of the two could run as the RDP candidate. The Court accepted Algabid's candidacy and rejected Cissé's candidacy on September 3. On September 12, Cissé created a new party, the Union for Democracy and the Republic (UDR), as a split from the RDP.

Events since 2009
Boubacar Cissé was prominent in the opposition to Mamadou Tandja's short lived 6th Republic of 2009–2010, being named chief of delegation by the multiparty CFDR opposition front during the ECOWAS brokered crisis talks with the government.  His UDR-Tabbat was expected to compete in the 2011 presidential and parliamentary elections.

After Mahamadou Issoufou won the January–March 2011 presidential election and took office as president on 7 April 2011, Cissé was appointed to the government as Minister of State for Planning, Regional Development, and Community Development on 21 April 2011.

References

1948 births
Living people
Ministers of council of Niger
Prime Ministers of Niger
Finance ministers of Niger
People from Niamey
Rally for Democracy and Progress (Niger) politicians
Union for Democracy and the Republic (Niger) politicians
Fula people